Proyecto Uno (in English: Project One) is a Dominican-American hip hop/Merengue house group which helped popularize a style of music which blends merengue with techno, dancehall, reggae and hip-hop/rap music. The band was founded in New York City's East Side in 1989 by Nelson Zapata and managed by Porfirio "Popi" Piña. Originally formed as traditional merengue band, Proyecto Uno received recognition in the 1990s, the group won Billboard Latin Music Awards, Premios Lo Nuestro and was nominated for an Emmy award. The current members are Nelson Zapata, Kid G and Paolo Tondo. The manager of the group currently is Rafael Zapata III.

Recognitions
1993 and 1995: Premios Ronda and Premios Orquídea (Venezuela)
1993 and 1996: New York ACE Awards
1994: Premios Lo Nuestro, Música Rap 1994
1994, 1995 and 1997: New York Premios Estrella 
1996 and 1997: New York Premios Too Much 
1996: Song of the Colombian World Cup Team Está Pegao
1997: Billboard Latin Music Awards, Rap Album Of the Year, In Da’ House 1997
1998: Billboard Latin Music Awards, Latin Dance Single of the Year, Mueve La Cadera (Move your Hips) with Reel 2 Reel
1998: Nominated: Premios Lo Nuestro, Grupo Del Año-Tropical
1999: Nominated to Billboard Latin Music Awards, Latin Dance Club Play Track of the Year, No Nos Tenemos (NNT)
1999: Emmy Awards, Outstanding Original Music Composition
2000: Nominated Colombian Song of the Year 25 horas
2003: Premios Lo Nuestro, Album of the Year, Urbana for PURA GOZADERA

Discography
 1990 Todo el Mundo!
 1993 Está Pega'o
 1993 In Da House
 1995 10 Super Éxitos
 1996 New Era
 1996 Mega Mix Hits
 1997 Éxitos de Proyecto Uno
 1997 ¡Más Que Éxitos! 
 1998 The Remixes
 1999 4
 2002 20 Éxitos
 2002 Todo Éxitos
 2003 Pura Gozadera
 2005 Éxitos de Proyecto Uno 
 2006 Evolution
 2013 Original
 2018 Organico

Singles
 "El Tiburón" (The Shark) (1993)
 "Pumpin'"
 "Materialista
 "Cuarto de hotel"
 "El grillero"
 "Te dejaron flat"
 "Tan interesada"
 "Todo el mundo" (everybody)
 "Brinca" {Jump}
 "Nu nu"
 "25 horas" (25 hours)
 "Al otro lado del mar"
 "Hombre fiel"
 "Empujando el cielo"
 "Es tu cumpleaños"
 "Holla"
 "Monotonía"
 "Fiebre"
 "Another Night"
 "Déjame probar" (taste your love)
 "Candela"
 "Está pegao"
 "Déjame tener algo contigo" (Let Me Have Something With You)
 "Latinos"
 "Mueve la cadera" (Move your hip)
 "El Party" 
 "Enamora'o"  (In Love)
 "Que siga la fiesta"
 "Dale pa'l piso"
 "Beautiful Lady" 
 "Ya llegó el viernes" (y mi cuerpo lo sabe) 
 "Call Me" https://music.apple.com/us/album/organico/1436993874
 "Dime si me quieres" https://music.apple.com/us/album/organico/1436993874

References

https://www.efe.com/efe/america/mexico/proyecto-uno-regresa-con-nuevos-temas-y-una-modernizacion-de-sus-exitos/50000545-4463354

https://www.infobae.com/teleshow/infoshow/2020/08/01/de-trabajar-sin-saberlo-para-el-desarrollo-del-viagra-a-crear-el-hit-el-tiburon-la-sorprendente-historia-del-lider-de-proyecto-uno/
 http://proyectouno.net
 Auth. Booking Agent - (305) 788-7753

American hip hop groups
American merengue musicians
Musical groups established in 1989
1989 establishments in New York City
Merengue music groups